Matteo Bisiani (born 2 August 1978) is an Italian archer. He competed in the 1996 Olympic Games and in the 2000 Olympic Games.

Biography
He was born in Monfalcone. In 1996 he won the bronze medal with the Italian team. In the individual competition he finished ninth.

Four years later he won the silver medal as member of the Italian team. In the individual competition he finished 21st.

References
 RAI Profile

1978 births
Living people
Italian male archers
Olympic archers of Italy
Archers at the 1996 Summer Olympics
Archers at the 2000 Summer Olympics
Olympic silver medalists for Italy
Olympic bronze medalists for Italy
Olympic medalists in archery
Medalists at the 2000 Summer Olympics
World Archery Championships medalists
Medalists at the 1996 Summer Olympics
20th-century Italian people
21st-century Italian people